Love Sick ("Sickly relationships") is a 2006 Romanian drama film directed by Tudor Giurgiu. It is a lesbian-themed love story that has been compared to My Summer of Love.

Plot 
Alex and Cristina (Kiki) are university students who end up living in the same building. Their friendship develops quickly, overcoming several phases, from fellowship to care and tenderness. While the two are very different, the two girls get along fine, except for the moments when a third character shows up — Sandu. Kiki's brother is permanently tormented by an unnatural jealousy which implies an incestuous liaison between the two siblings.

Unlike other recent Romanian films, it is not a reflection on Romania's communist or post-communist history; the country is merely a background for the different relationships.

Cast
Maria Popistașu as Kiki
Ioana Barbu as Alex
Tudor Chirila as Sandu
Catalina Murgea as Mrs. Benes
Mircea Diaconu as Mr. Dragnea
Virginia Mirea as Mrs. Dragnea
Tora Vasilescu as Mrs. Parvulescu
Valentin Popescu as Mr. Parvulescu
Mihai Dinvale as Prof. Mihailescu
Carmen Tănase as Waitress
Puya as Taxi driver
Mihaela Rădulescu as Mrs. Negulescu
Robert Paschall Jr. as Bo

Background
The film was adapted from a novel by Cecilia Stefanescu.

Awards
Love Sick shared the grand jury prize in November 2006 at the 19th edition of the Image+Nation Festival, Montreal, Canada's LGBT Film Festival.
Actress Maria Popistasu won Jury Special Award for Performance at the 'Anonimul' International Film Festival in Romania.
Actress Ioana Barbu won Best Actress at the Pécs International Film Festival.

Distribution
It premiered at the 2006 Berlin International Film Festival as part of the Teddy Awards. It went on to appear at a number of international film festivals including the Seattle International Film Festival and the 
London Lesbian and Gay Film Festival.

See also
 Romanian New Wave

References

External links
Official website

 

2006 drama films
2006 LGBT-related films
2006 films
Films based on Romanian novels
French drama films
French LGBT-related films
Lesbian-related films
Romanian drama films
2000s Romanian-language films
Romanian LGBT-related films
Incest in film
2000s French films